Shehzad Ahmed may refer to:

 Shehzad Ahmed (cricketer) (born 1991), Danish cricketer
 Shehzad Ahmed (poet) (1932–2012), Pakistani poet

See also
 Shahzad Ahmed (born 1978), Bahraini cricketer
 Ahmed Shehzad (born 1991), Pakistani cricketer